Events in the year 1964 in Sweden.

Incumbents
 Monarch – Gustaf VI Adolf
 Prime Minister – Tage Erlander

Events
1 January – the Name Act of 1963, comes into full and legal effect .

Popular culture

Music
Ballader och oförskämdheter, Cornelis Vreeswijk's debut album

Births
24 January – Annika Dahlman, cross country skier
30 January – Marcel Jacob.
7 July – Dominik Henzel, Czech-born actor and comedian
26 July – Carl-Johan Vallgren.
5 September – Anna Fiske, illustrator and comics creator.

Full date missing
Mats Gerdau.
Torbjörn Flygt.

Deaths
26 May – Sven Friberg.
5 August – Moa Martinson, author (born 1890).
19 December – Arne Lindblad.

References

 
Years of the 20th century in Sweden
1960s in Sweden
Sweden
Sweden